Surya Vamsam ( and ) is a 1997 Indian Tamil-language drama film written and directed by Vikraman. The film stars R. Sarathkumar in dual lead roles with Devayani. The film's score and soundtrack are composed by S. A. Rajkumar. It was one of the biggest blockbusters of the year 1997. It was subsequently remade into Telugu under the same title (1998), in Hindi as Sooryavansham (1999), and in Kannada as Surya Vamsha (2000).

Plot

Sakthivel Gounder is a rich, influential and one of the most educated men in his village near Pollachi. He has a wife Latha, three sons, and a daughter. Sakthivel hates his youngest son Chinnarasu. Sakthivel's daughter's wedding is fixed, and Nandini is the groom's sister. She meets Chinnarasu during her brother's wedding and wonders why Sakthivel dislikes him. Chinnarasu's sidekick Rasappa tells a flashback to Nandini.

Chinnarasu was weak in studies from childhood. He was in love with his relative Gowri, and elders decide to get them married. However, Gowri is educated, and she attempts suicide, thinking that Chinnarasu is not a perfect match for her as he is uneducated and illiterate. Chinnarasu saves Gowri and cancels the marriage proposal, but blames himself and does not reveal the truth. This angers Sakthivel, thinking that Chinnarasu did not respect his words and stopped talking to him.

Nandini gets impressed understanding Chinnarasu's kind heart and develops an affection towards him. Nandini proposes to Chinnarasu, for which he does not agree. Later, he too understands her true love and accepts. Both get their marriage registered, but Sakthivel gets angry knowing about this and asks the couple to vacate the home. Chinnarasu and Nandini move to a small home on the outskirts, and he secures a job in a bus transport company. With the help of Nandini's uncle, Chinnarasu purchases a bus and starts a transport company. Over the time, he develops his business and becomes a rich man. Also, Nandini clears civil services and gets posted as the district collector.

Sakthivel gets surprised seeing his son and daughter-in-law's growth in life. Gowri's husband suffers losses in his business which is later closed down, and she comes to meet Chinnarasu, requesting him to provide the job of Marketing Manager in his sugar factory, for which he accepts. Sakthivel meets Chinnarasu's son Sakthivel Jr. at school and develops a bonding towards him. Chinnarasu gets to know this and feels happy. Sakthivel realizes his mistake of not understanding his son. Meanwhile, Dharmalingam Gounder has a rivalry against Sakthivel and plans to kill him and blame Chinnarasu. Dharmalingam adds poison to the sweet given to Sakthivel by Chinnarasu, but Sakthivel is saved, and Dharmalingam gets beaten up by the people. In the end, everyone gets united and lives as a joint family.

Cast

Production
The story of the film was made by director Vikraman in the year 1988 planning to cast actor Vijayakumar and Karthik in lead roles, but after 10 years the film got its venture. In 1996, producer R. B. Choudary celebrated a great success of Poove Unakkaga. That time he asked Vikraman to direct once again under his Super Good Film banner. This time Vikraman came with a relationship between elder brother and younger brother which later became Vaanathaipola (2000). After writing the story, he immediately narrated the story to the producer. He was so inspired by story and he decided to produce the film, but he had put one demand to Vikraman to direct this story with Sarath Kumar and give dual role for the character of Vellaichamy and Muthu like twin brothers but Vikraman didn't accept to make this character with Sarath Kumar because he thought of Janagaraj for Vellaichamy character and Vijay for Muthu character. After many arguments, Vikraman decided to make the film with Sarathkumar with a different story and Choudary did not accept this at first but later he was convinced with half heart to accept Suryavamsam which Vikraman had scripted.

Soundtrack
The soundtrack is composed by S. A. Rajkumar. There are a total of six tracks in this film.

Remakes
Suryavamsam was remade into Telugu under the same title (1998), in Hindi as Sooryavansham (1999), and in Kannada as Surya Vamsha (2000).

References

External links 
 

1990s Tamil-language films
1997 drama films
1997 films
Films scored by S. A. Rajkumar
Indian drama films
Tamil films remade in other languages
Super Good Films films